Denis Inkin (born 7 January 1978)  is a Russian former professional boxer who fought in Germany at super middleweight.

Amateur career
Before turning professional Inkin had an extensive career as an amateur whilst serving as a Captain in the tank forces of the Russian army.

Amateur record
1994 won the European Cadet Championships (U-17) in Patras, Greece as a Light Middleweight.
1997 won the Military World Championships in San Antonio, USA as a Middleweight.
1999 won the 2nd Military World Games in Zagreb, Croatia as a Middleweight. The results were:

Professional career

Debut fight
Inkin's first fight as a professional boxer was in June 2001, in his home town of  Novosibirsk, when he beat Kazakhstani fighter Talgat Abdykarimov with a first round knockout.

Russian base
Inkin fought all of his first 23 fights in Russia and the Ukraine, with the exception of one in the United Kingdom, winning all of his fights with 17 wins by KO.

First belt
During his time being based in Russia, Inkin fought for his first title belt against Bulgarian Veselin Nikolaev Vasilev in Moscow, for the vacant IBF Inter-Continental super middleweight title. Inkin knocked Vasilev out in the first round to take the title.

Move to Germany
He moved to Germany in June 2005 from where he boxed in Germany, Austria, Slovenia and Croatia and won that WBC International super middleweight title against German Mario Veit with a seventh round KO of Veit.

WBO Super middleweight title
On September 27, 2008, at the Color Line Arena in Hamburg, Germany, Inkin claimed the vacant WBO super middleweight title, previously  held by Joe Calzaghe for over 11 years, with a twelve round unanimous decision victory over Fulgencio Zuniga.  In January 2009, in his first defence of the title, Inkin lost to Hungarian Karoly Balzsay over 12 rounds in Germany.

References

External links
 

1978 births
Living people
Super-middleweight boxers
World Boxing Organization champions
Sportspeople from Novosibirsk
Russian male boxers